Katsuki James Otsuka (January 22, 1921 – May 25, 1984) was a Nisei Japanese American Quaker who was jailed as a conscientious objector during World War II, and later became a war tax resister.

During World War II, after the signing of Executive Order 9066, Otsuka was interned at the Tule Lake War Relocation Center. Otsuka was classified by the draft board as a conscientious objector subject to "noncombatant service in the armed forces", but he was unwilling to participate in the armed forces in any capacity and argued, unsuccessfully, that he should have been classified as a conscientious objector subject to "civilian work of national importance."  Unable to change his classification, and unwilling to serve in the armed forces, he surrendered to the New York District Attorney and pleaded guilty to a violation of the draft law and sentenced to three years in prison.

Otsuka testified: 

Again imprisoned in 1949, this time for not paying $4.50 in taxes as a war protest, he stayed in prison a month longer than his 4-month sentence because he refused to pay his fine.

Two months after his release, on August 5, 1950 (one day before the fifth anniversary of the dropping of the atomic bomb on Hiroshima), he was arrested with two other protesters for passing out leaflets at the Y-12 nuclear weapons facility in Oak Ridge, Tennessee.  These leaflets read, in part:

I have come to Oak Ridge... to dramatize to my fellow citizens that our tax money is being used in large part for the destruction of the world.  At 10:45 on an August morning in 1945 the first atomic bomb was used for human destruction. I came today to burn, at that hour, 70% of a dollar bill, symbolizing the percentage of taxes that, according to our President, Harry Truman, is being used for military preparation and for fighting the "Cold War."

See also
 Conscientious objection to military taxation
 Conscription in the United States

References

1921 births
American conscientious objectors
American human rights activists
American Quakers
American tax resisters
Japanese-American civil rights activists
American people of Japanese descent
1984 deaths
American Christian pacifists
Japanese-American internees
War Resisters League activists
20th-century Quakers